Alexa von Porembsky (5 June 1906 - 18 August 1981) was a Hungarian-born German actress.

Selected filmography

 Leontine's Husbands (1928)
 Woman in the Moon (1929) - Eine Veilchenverkäuferin
 Road to Rio (1931) - Die Unerfahrene
 Zimmer 12 a (1931)
 Wrong Number, Miss (1932) - Telefonistin
 The Ladies Diplomat (1932)
 The Cheeky Devil (1932) - Annette
 Der Diamant des Zaren (1932) - Prinzessin Eudoxia
 Heinz in the Moon (1934) - Emma, Dienstmädchen von Ass
 The Cossack and the Nightingale (1935) - Nina, Vera's Maid
 Der Außenseiter (1935) - Amanda
 Woman's Love—Woman's Suffering (1937) - Frieda, Zimmermädchen
 The Model Husband (1937) - Mary
 Das Mädchen mit dem guten Ruf (1938) - Bianca
 Scheidungsreise (1938) - Paula Hitze
 The Leghorn Hat (1939) - Clara
 Salonwagen E 417 (1939) - Ellen
 Spähtrupp Hallgarten (1941) - Toni
 I Entrust My Wife to You (1943) - Dienstmädchen
 Leichtes Blut (1943) - Frl. Assmann
 The Appeal to Conscience (1949) - Hörspielsprechen
 Don't Play with Love (1949) - Frau Pleßmann
 How Do We Tell Our Children? (1949)
 Der Posaunist (1949) - Susanne Taller, Soubrette
 When Men Cheat (1950)
 Not Without Gisela (1951) - Lottchen Zwieback
 At the Well in Front of the Gate (1952) - Gerti - Kellnerin
 Josef the Chaste (1953) - Lotte Müller
 Mailman Mueller (1953)
 The Seven Dresses of Katrin (1954)
 King Thrushbeard (1954) - Marktfrau
 Captain Wronski (1954)
 Roman eines Frauenarztes (1954) - Babette
 Der Froschkönig (1954) - Spielfrau Mathilde
 Doctor Solm (1955) - Schwester Franziska
 I Was an Ugly Girl (1955) - Frau Howald
 Du mein stilles Tal (1955) - Dienstmädchen
 Das Sandmännchen (1955)
 The Three from the Filling Station (1955)
 Alibi (1955) - Hausangestellte Maria
 Fruit Without Love (1956) - Anna
 The Road to Paradise (1956)
 Black Forest Melody (1956)
 Das Sonntagskind (1956) - Kundin im Metzgerladen
 Musikparade (1956) - Agathe
 Was die Schwalbe sang (1956) - Dame im Sendesaal
 Stresemann (1957) - Mme. Leger
 The Night of the Storm (1957) - Emmy
 Mischief in Wonderland (1957)
 Europas neue Musikparade 1958 (1957)
 Ferien auf Immenhof (1957) - Frau Rehmann
 It Happened Only Once (1958) - Mutter Schröder
 Das verbotene Paradies (1958) - Frau Dettmann
 Kleine Leute mal ganz groß (1958) - Ute Krüger
 Kriegsgericht (1959)
 For Love and Others (1959) - Jutta Pohl, Straßenmädchen
 Jacqueline (1959) - Frau Klose
 Adorable Arabella (1959)
 The Last Witness (1960) - Sekretärin
 Zu jung für die Liebe? (1961) - Lina
 Via Mala (1961) - Wirtin Gumpers
 Kohlhiesels Töchter (1962)

Bibliography
 Jung, Uli & Schatzberg, Walter. Beyond Caligari: The Films of Robert Wiene. Berghahn Books, 1999.

External links

1906 births
1981 deaths
German film actresses
German silent film actresses
People from Sopron
20th-century German actresses